This article is a brief summary of Law No. 35/2016 "On the Rights of the Author and Other Rights Related to", approved by the Albanian Parliament on 31 March 2016. The purpose of the law is to guarantee the protection of the author's copyrights and other related rights.

Summary 
The subject matter of copyrighted work shall be any original intellectual creation in the literary, artistic and scientific domain, having an individual character, irrespective of the manner and form of its expression, its type, value or purpose, unless otherwise provided for in this law.

Works of Copyright subjected to protection shall be in particular:

The protections of the author's rights are specifically mentioned in Article 58 of the Constitution of Albania

See also 
 Albanian Copyright Office
 General Directorate of Industrial Property

References 

Albania